memo - Magazine of European Medical Oncology  is a peer-reviewed medical journal published by Springer and covering the fields of hematology and oncology. memo is the official journal of the Central European Cooperative Oncology Group.

memo includes editorials and comments, peer-reviewed original reports, short reviews, case reports and controversies, articles explaining the biology of neoplasia, and congress reports.

Abstracting and indexing
The journal is abstracted and indexed by EMBASE, Expanded Academic, Google Scholar, and Summon by Serial Solutions.

Central European Cooperative Oncology Group
The Central European Cooperative Oncology Group groups centers of clinical oncology from Central and Southeastern Europe as well as Israel that conduct of clinical trials. It also provides postgraduate education in oncology.

References

External links
 
 The Central European Cooperative Oncology Group

Hematology journals
Springer Science+Business Media academic journals
Oncology journals
Quarterly journals
English-language journals
Publications established in 2008